Bradley Wood (born 1991) is an English footballer.

Bradley Wood may also refer to:
 Bradley Wood West Yorkshire, the base of and county camp-site for West Yorkshire County Scouts

See also
 Bradley Woods, an area of woodland in Wiltshire
 Bradley and Dixon Woods, a local nature reserve near Grimsby, North East Lincolnshire